Aurantimicrobium photophilum is a bacterium from the genus of Aurantimicrobium which has been isolated from a freshwater lake.

References

Microbacteriaceae
Bacteria described in 2021